The term legal technicality is a casual or colloquial phrase referring to a technical aspect of law.  The phrase is not a term of art in the law; it has no exact meaning, nor does it have a legal definition. It implies that strict adherence to the letter of the law has prevented the spirit of the law from being enforced -- that is, the law applied as written, in opposition to what was intended by whoever wrote the law. However, as a vague term, the definition of a technicality varies from person to person, and it is often simply used to denote any portion of the law that interferes with the  outcome desired by the user of the term.

Some legal technicalities govern legal procedure, enable or restrict access to courts, and/or enable or limit the discretion of a court in handing down judgment. These are aspects of procedural law.  Other legal technicalities deal with aspects of substantive law, that is, aspects of the law that articulate specific criteria that a court uses to assess a party's compliance with or violation of, for example, one or more criminal laws or civil laws.

See also
 Legal abuse
 Legal fiction
 Letter and spirit of the law
 Loophole

References

Informal legal terminology
Legal procedure
Abuse of the legal system